A list of Bangladesh films released in 1975.

Releases

See also

1975 in Bangladesh

References

External links 
 Bangladeshi films on Internet Movie Database

Film
Bangladesh
 1975